VARB may mean:

 a Vodka Red Bull
 a pseudonym of Canadian cartoonist Raoul Barré (1874-1932)
 a software package used to perform variable rules analysis